McAllister Springs is an unincorporated community in Saline County, in the U.S. state of Missouri.

History
A variant name was "McAllister". A post office called McAllister was established in 1881, and remained in operation until 1907. The nearby springs bear the name of one Mr. McAllister, the original owner of the site.

References

Unincorporated communities in Saline County, Missouri
Unincorporated communities in Missouri